Teplička may refer to several places in Czech Republic and Slovakia.

Teplička (Karlovy Vary District)
Teplička, Spišská Nová Ves District